Die Entscheidung des Tilman Riemenschneider is a 1954  East German television film written by  about the medieval wood carver Tilman Riemenschneider.

External links
 

1954 films
1954 television plays
1950s biographical films
German biographical films
German television films
East German films
Television in East Germany
1950s German-language films
German-language television shows
Films set in the 16th century
Films set in Germany
Biographical films about artists
Riemenschneider
Riemenschneider
1950s German films